The Bishop of Clonfert is an episcopal title which takes its name after the village of Clonfert in County Galway, Ireland. In the Roman Catholic Church it remains as a separate title; but in the Church of Ireland it has been united with other bishoprics.

History
The diocese of Clonfert was one of the twenty-four dioceses established at the Synod of Rathbreasail in 1111, and its boundaries were fixed at the Synod of Kells in 1152. During the Reformation, the bishops changed their allegiance back and forth between the Pope and the Crown. After the Reformation, there were parallel apostolic successions.

In the Church of Ireland, the title continued until 1625, when it united with Kilmacduagh, forming the united see of Clonfert and Kilmacduagh.

In the Roman Catholic Church, the title remains a separate bishopric. The current incumbent is the Most Reverend Michael Duignan, Bishop of the Roman Catholic Diocese of Clonfert, who was appointed on 16 July 2019 and ordained bishop on 13 October 2019. In 2021 the Holy See determined that the diocese of Clonfert and the Roman Catholic Diocese of Galway, Kilmacduagh and Kilfenora would share a bishop.

Pre-Reformation bishops

Bishops during the Reformation

Post-Reformation bishops

Church of Ireland succession

Roman Catholic succession

References

Bibliography

External links

Clonfert
Roman Catholic Diocese of Clonfert
Religion in County Galway
Clonfert
Bishops of Killaloe or Kilfenora or Clonfert or of Kilmacduagh
 Bishop